In cricket, a five-wicket haul (also known as a "five–for" or "fifer") refers to a bowler taking five or more wickets in a single innings. This is regarded as a notable achievement, and as of July 2021 only 49 players have taken 15 or more five-wicket hauls at international level in their cricketing careers. Shakib Al Hasan, a slow left-arm orthodox spinner, represents the Bangladesh national cricket team. With 24 five-wicket hauls across all formats of international cricket, he ranks equal 15th in the all-time list, and first among his countrymen. He has been described as "Bangladesh's greatest-ever cricketer", and is ranked as the top all-rounder in One Day International (ODI) cricket as of August 2022.

Shakib's first five-wicket haul came against New Zealand during the first Test of the 2008–09 home series; he took seven wickets for 36 runs in New Zealand's first innings. As of May 2022, it remains his best bowling figures in Test cricket. He ended the year with three more five-wicket hauls, which came in consecutive innings against South Africa and Sri Lanka. In Test cricket, he is among the four bowlers who have taken five-wicket hauls against all Test-playing nations.

Shakib made his ODI debut in 2007, a year before his first Test appearance. He has taken two five-wicket hauls in the format. His best figures in the format are five wickets for 29 runs against Afghanistan in the 2019 World Cup. 

Shakib is one of the eleven cricketers to take at least one five wicket-haul in all three formats.

Key

Tests

ODIs

T20Is

Notes

References

Lists of Bangladesh cricket records and statistics
Shakib Al Hasan